JPMorgan Chase is an American multinational banking corporation with a large presence in the United Kingdom. The corporation’s European subsidiaries J.P. Morgan Europe Limited, J.P. Morgan International Bank Limited and J.P. Morgan Securities plc are headquartered in London.

History
J.P. Morgan's founder is J. Pierpont Morgan. His father, Junius Spencer Morgan, was in the merchant banking business in London from 1854 until his death in 1890. In 1873, the Scottish American Investment Trust, a predecessor firm (Robert Fleming & Co. was sold to Chase Manhattan in 2000) was formed. In 1887, Jarvis-Conklin Mortgage Trust Company opened in London and through a series of mergers and reorganizations, this firm became part of Chase Bank.

The bank joined CHAPS during 2010.

The company has provided the Post Office card account since 2006, acquired investment bank Cazenove in 2010 and acquired London based online investment firm Nutmeg in June 2021. JPMorgan Chase launched a retail banking operation in the UK in September 2021 under the Chase brand name.

Locations
J.P. Morgan Chase does not operate bank branches in the UK but has offices in London (which serves as the headquarters), Bournemouth, Glasgow and Edinburgh. The Bournemouth office is the largest private sector employer in Dorset, while in Glasgow J.P. Morgan is one of the largest technology employers in Scotland.

During December 2010 an announcement was made that the previous headquarters of Lehman Brothers at 25 Bank Street in Canary Wharf would be purchased to function as the company's European head office.

Commercial and investment banking services

Asset Management
J.P. Morgan Asset Management provides investment solutions to financial institutions, sovereigns, intermediaries and private individuals. It is based in London.

Global Corporate Bank
Provides corporate banking services to large corporations, financial institutions and public sector organizations. Services include financing, risk management, working capital, cash management and investments.

Investment Bank
The investment bank is one of the largest in the United Kingdom. It offers banking services including M&A advisory, corporate banking, debt capital markets, capital raising and risk management.

J.P. Morgan Cazenove
J.P. Morgan Cazenove became a wholly owned part of J.P. Morgan in 2010, having originally operated as a joint venture between J.P. Morgan and the UK investment bank Cazenove. Its three core businesses are corporate finance, cash equities and equity research. It is based in London. J.P Morgan Cazenove is a trading name of J.P. Morgan Securities plc.

Post office card account contract
J.P. Morgan Europe Ltd is currently providing the banking licence and the electronic benefits transfer banking engine for the Post Office card account, since 24 January 2006 having taken over from the previous provider Citibank. The deal of exchange of services was valued at $380,000,000. New applications for a Post Office card account were closed on 11 May 2020, with existing accounts remaining open until November 2022.

The Post Office Card Account (POca) is a cash handling account allowing customers to receive benefit payments. The Card Account cannot be accessed anywhere other than a Post Office Counter or ATM at a post office branch. These accounts can only receive issuances of the DWP benefit payments and HMRC Tax Credits and Child Benefit payments. To open an account, you must be in receipt of benefits and a referral is made via Jobcentre Plus.

Private Banking
A franchise that provides wealth management services to ultra-high-net-worth individuals and families.

Treasury & Securities Services
Made up of two divisions, Treasury and Worldwide Securities Services. Treasury Services provides cash management products, trade finance and logistics solutions, wholesale card products, and short-term liquidity management capabilities to small and mid-sized companies, multinational corporations, financial institutions and government entities  while Worldwide Securities Services stores, values, clears and services securities and alternative investments for investors and broker-dealers.

Retail banking

Chase UK

Chase is a UK-based retail banking brand operating as a division of J.P. Morgan Europe Ltd.

History
In January 2021, JP Morgan Chase announced that it was to enter the UK retail banking sector, under the Chase brand, later that year, establishing its first non-US retail banking operation in its history. The first Chase branded products in the UK were launched in September 2021.

Services
The Chase branded app-based current account and linked savings account was launched in Late September 2021 . The account allows customers to send and receive money via Faster Payments and since March 2022, the option to pay by direct debits. Chase plans to launch further products in the next three to four years including, savings and investment accounts, personal lending and  mortgage loans. A savings account was launched in March 2022.

Banking errors

November 2002-July 2009
The bank was fined £33,320,000 for failing to protect the money of the clientele of the bank during November 2002 and July 2009. The lack of due consideration was given as resulting from error,  and elsewhere as caused by the efforts of ring-fencing.

April 2012
A senior executive of the bank resigned in April 2012 having been found to have committed a civil crime amounting to market abuse, as defined by the FSA.

May 2012

The chief officer and others having made errors during May 2012, causing losses to the bank amounting to £1.2 billion, were  expected to resign. At the time of the report JP Morgan was stated as considering the closure of the London investment unit.

References

JPMorgan Chase
Financial services in the United Kingdom